General elections were held in Denmark on 21 September 1971 and in the Faroe Islands on 5 October. The Social Democratic Party remained the largest in the Folketing, with 70 of the 179 seats. Voter turnout was 87% in Denmark proper, 57% in the Faroe Islands and 52% in Greenland (where only one of the two constituencies was contested as the other had only a single candidate who was elected unopposed). They were the first elections using the new counties as constituencies.

Results

References

Elections in Denmark
Denmark
1971 elections in Denmark
September 1971 events in Europe